"Ai no Bakudan" is the thirty-eighth single by B'z, released on March 9, 2005. This song is one of B'z many number-one singles in Oricon charts.

The song was re-recorded in 2012 with English lyrics and released as "Love Bomb" as part of the band's iTunes-exclusive English album.

Track listing 

Fever

Ai no Bakudan (TV Style)
Ai no Bakudan (Guitar Solo Less)

Certifications

References 
B'z performance at Oricon

2005 singles
B'z songs
Oricon Weekly number-one singles
Songs written by Tak Matsumoto
Songs written by Koshi Inaba
2005 songs